The Sikkim High Court is the High Court of the Indian state of Sikkim. The history of the court can be traced back to 1955, when the High Court of Judicature (Jurisdiction and Powers) Proclamation, 1955 was issued to establish a High Court in Sikkim. Upon merger, Sikkim became the 22nd State of India. Under Clause (i) of Article 371F, the High Court functioning immediately prior to the date of merger became the High Court for the State of Sikkim under the Constitution like any other High Court in the country. It was established in 1975.

The seat of the court is at Gangtok, the administrative capital of the state. With a sanctioned court strength of three judges, the Sikkim High Court is the smallest High Court of India.

Chief Justice
Hon'ble Mr. Justice Biswanath Somadder was appointed the Chief Justice of the Sikkim High Court effective from 12 October 2021.

List
 Hon’ble Justice Man Mohan Singh Gujral (7 May 1976–14 March 1983)
 Hon’ble Justice Mohan Lall Shrimal (17 December 1983–3 January 1985)
 Hon’ble Justice Jugal Kishore Mohanty (21 January 1986–4 January 1989)
 Hon’ble Justice Braja Nath Misra (20 January 1990–8 November 1992)
 Hon’ble Justice Surendra Nath Bhargava (20 January 1993–10 February 1996)
 Hon’ble Justice Krishna Murari Agarwal (15 February 1996–26 October 1996)
 Hon’ble Justice Kanniappa Arumuga Thanikkachallam (27 August 1997–26 September 1997)
 Hon’ble Justice Repusudan Dayal (3 February 1999–17 May 2003)
 Hon’ble Justice Radha Krishna Patra (9 July 2003–23 November 2004)
 Hon’ble Justice Binod Kumar Roy (30 September 2005–26 December 2006)
 Hon’ble Justice Ajoy Nath Ray (27 January 2007–30 October 2008)
 Hon’ble Justice Aftab Hussain Saikia (7 March 2009–7 April 2010)
 Hon’ble Justice Barin Ghosh (judge) (13 April 2010–8 August 2010)
 Hon’ble Justice P. D. Dinakaran (9 August 2010 – 29 June 2011)
 Hon’ble Justice Permod Kohli (12 December 2011–March 2013)
 Hon’ble Justice Pius C. Kuriakose (28 March 2013–1 February 2013)
 Hon'ble Justice N.K. Jain (7 January 2014–7 October 2014)
 Hon'ble Justice Sunil Kumar Sinha (8 October 2014–6 July 2016)
 Hon'ble Justice Satish K. Agnihotri (22 September 2016–2018)
 Hon'ble Justice Vijay Kumar Bist (30 October 2018–16 September 2019)
 Hon'ble Justice Arup Kumar Goswami (15 October 2019–5 January 2021)
 Hon'ble Justice Jitendra Kumar Maheshwari (6 January 2021–31 August 2021)
 Hon’ble Justice Biswanath Somadder (12 October 2021–Incumbent)

See also
List of high courts in India

Notes

References
 Jurisdiction and Seats of Indian High Courts
 Judge strength in High Courts increased

External links
 The Sikkim High Court website

Government of Sikkim
Gangtok
1975 establishments in Sikkim
Courts and tribunals established in 1975